The following is a list of neighborhoods in Raleigh, North Carolina.

Inside the Beltline
Anderson Heights
Avent West
Belvidere Park
Battery Heights 
Bloomsbury 
Boylan Heights
Cameron Park
Cameron Village
Capitol District
Capitol Heights
Country Club Hills
Coley Forest
Depot District
Drewry Hills
Fayetteville Street
Five Points Historic Neighborhoods
Glenwood-Brooklyn
Glenwood South
Glenwood Village
Hayes Barton
Hi-Mount
Historic Oakwood
Longview Gardens

 Madonna Acres
 Maiden Lane
Moore Square
Mordecai District
North Carolina State University
Raleigh Country Club
Roanoke Park
Rochester Heights
South Park
State Government District
Vanguard Park
 Victoria Place
Warehouse District
 West Raleigh Historic District
Wayland Heights
Woodcrest
University Park

North Raleigh 
Avalaire
Bent Tree
Brentwood Estates
Brier Creek
Brookhaven
Coachmans Trail
Crabtree Valley
Crossgate
Dominion Park
Durant Trails
Fairfax Hills
Falls Church
Falls River/Bedford
Hickory Hills
Lake Park
Lakemont
Leesville
Manchester
Millbrook
New Hope
Northchester
North Hills
North Pointe
North Ridge
North Ridge Country Club
Oak Park
Pinecrest
Quail Hollow
Quail Meadows
Quail Ridge
Skycrest
Southall
Springdale/Leesville
Stonebridge
Stonehenge
Summerfield
Summit Ridge
Tadlock Plantation
Tealbriar
Thorpshire
Timberlake
Village on the Green
Wakefield Plantation
Westlake
Wood Valley

West Raleigh and Southwest Raleigh 
Asbury
Brandywine
Laurel Hills
Medfield
Olde Raleigh
Trinity Woods
Tysonville
Umstead
Westover

South and East Raleigh 
Biltmore Hills
Carolina Pines
Hedingham
Lake Wheeler
Parkland
Renaissance Park
Rhamkatte
Skycrest Village
Southall
Southgate
Swift Creek
Trailwood
Walnut Creek
Wilder's Grove

Lists of neighborhoods in U.S. cities
Neighborhoods in Raleigh, North Carolina